The second indirect presidential election was held in Hungary on 19 June 1995. Head of state Árpád Göncz (SZDSZ) was re-elected as president with an absolute majority.

References 

Presidential elections in Hungary
1995 elections